Seung-gi, also spelled Seung-ki or Sung-gi, is a Korean masculine given name. The meaning differs based on the hanja used to write each syllable of the name. There are 15 hanja with the reading "seung" and 68 hanja with the reading "ki" on the South Korean government's official list of hanja which may be used in given names.

People with this name include:
Ri Sung-gi (1905–1996), North Korean chemist
Lee Seung-gi (born 1987), South Korean singer and actor
Lee Seung-gi (footballer) (born 1988), South Korean footballer

See also
List of Korean given names

References

Korean masculine given names